Michał Urbaniak (born January 22, 1943) is a Polish jazz musician who plays violin, lyricon, and saxophone. His music includes elements of  folk music, rhythm and blues, hip hop, and symphonic music.

History 
He was born in Warsaw, Poland. Urbaniak started his music education during high school in Łódź, Poland, and continued from 1961 in Warsaw in the violin class of Tadeusz Wroński. Learning to play on the alto saxophone alone, he first played in a Dixieland band, and later with Zbigniew Namysłowski and the Jazz Rockers, with whom he performed during the Jazz Jamboree festival in 1961. After this, he was invited to play with Andrzej Trzaskowski, and toured the United States in 1962 with the Andrzej Trzaskowski band, the Wreckers, playing at festivals and clubs in Newport, San Francisco, Chicago, Washington, D.C., and New York City.

After returning to Poland, he worked with Krzysztof Komeda's quintet (1962–1964). Together, they left for Scandinavia, where, after finishing a couple of contracts, Urbaniak remained until 1969. There he created a band with Urszula Dudziak and Wojciech Karolak, which gained considerable success and was later to be the starting point for the Michał Urbaniak Fusion.

After Urbaniak returned to Poland and the violin (which he abandoned for the saxophone during the time in Scandinavia), he created the Michał Urbaniak Group, to which he invited, among others, Urszula Dudziak (vocals), Adam Makowicz (piano), Pawel Jarzebski – bass and Czeslaw Bartkowski – drums  They recorded their first international albums, Parathyphus B, Instinct and played in many festivals, including Jazz Jamboree in 1969–1972. During the Montreux 1971 festival, Urbaniak was awarded "Grand Prix" for the best soloist and received a scholarship to the Berklee College of Music in Boston. After many triumphant concerts in Europe and the United States, in May 1973 he played for the last time before a Polish audience and emigrated with Urszula Dudziak on September 11, 1973, to the United States, where he now lives as a U.S. citizen.

Despite getting an award from Berklee, he did not study there. Recommended by John H. Hammond, Urbaniak signed a contract with Columbia Records, who published the West German album Super Constellation under the name Fusion. For the tour, he invited Polish musicians, including Czesław Bartkowski, Paweł Jarzębski and Wojciech Karolak. In 1974, Urbaniak formed the band Fusion and introduced melodic and rhythmic elements of Polish folk music into his funky New York-based music. With this band Urbaniak recorded another album for Columbia in New York: Atma.

Urbaniak followed his musical journey with innovative projects such as Urbanator (the first band to fuse rap & hip-hop in jazz), Urbanizer (a project with his band and four-piece R&B vocal group, 1978) and UrbSymphony. On January 27, 1995, UrbSymphony performed and recorded a concert with a rapper and a 60-piece symphony orchestra.

Since 1970 Urbaniak has been playing his custom-made, five-string violin furnished especially for him, a violin synthesizer nicknamed "talking" violin; soprano, alto and tenor saxophones; and lyricon, an electric saxophone-like horn. His fusion with a hint of folklore was becoming popular among American jazz musicians. He started to play in well known clubs such as the Village Vanguard and Village Gate, in famous concert halls such as Carnegie Hall, Beacon Theatre, and Avery Fisher Hall.

Urbaniak has played with Billy Cobham, Buster Williams, Chick Corea, Elvin Jones, Freddie Hubbard, George Benson, Herbie Hancock, Joe Henderson, Joe Zawinul, Kenny Barron, Larry Coryell, Lenny White, Marcus Miller, Quincy Jones, Ron Carter, Roy Haynes, Vladyslav Sendecki, Wayne Shorter, and Weather Report. In 1985, he was invited to play during the recording of Tutu with Miles Davis.

In 2012, he acted in the Polish film My Father's Bike.

Discography

As leader
 Urbaniak's Orchestra (1968)
 Paratyphus B (1970)
 Inactin (1971)
 New Violin Summit with Don Harris, Jean-Luc Ponty (1972)
 Super Constellation (and Constellation in Concert) (1973)
 Polish Jazz (1973)
 Atma (1974)
 Fusion (1974)
 Funk Factory (1975)
 Fusion III (EMI, 1975)
 Body English (1976)
 The Beginning (Catalyst, 1976)
 Tribute to Komeda (BASF, 1976)
 Urbaniak (Inner City, 1977)
 Ecstasy (Marlin, 1978)
 Urban Express (EastWest, 1979)
 Daybreak (Pausa, 1980)
 Music for Violin and Jazz Quartet (1980)
 Serenade for the City (1980)
 Folk Songs: Children's Melodies (Antilles, 1981)
 Jam at Sandy's (Jam, 1981)
 My One and Only Love (SteepleChase, 1982)
 The Larry Coryell and Michael Urbaniak Duo (Keynote, 1982)
 Recital with Władysław Sendecki (1983)
 A Quiet Day in Spring (Steeplechase, 1983)
 Take Good Care of My Heart (Steeplechase, 1984)
 New York Five at the Village Vanguard (1989)
 Songs for Poland (Ubx, 1988)
 Milky Way, Some Other Blues, Mardin (1990)
 Cinemode (Rykodisc, 1990)
 Songbird (SteepleChase, 1990)
 Michal Urbaniak (Headfirst, 1991)
 Manhattan Man (Milan, 1992)
 Milky Way (L & R, 1992)
 Burning Circuits, Urban Express, Manhattan Man (1992)
 Urbanator (1993)
 Friday Night at the Village Vanguard (Storyville, 1994)
 Some Other Blues (Steeplechase, 1994)
 Code Blue (1996)
 Urbanator II (1996)
 Live in Holy City (Ubx, 1997)
 Urbaniax (1998)
 Fusion (1999)
 Ask Me Now (SteepleChase, 2000)
 From Poland with Jazz (2002)
 Urbsymphony (Ubx, 2003)
 Decadence (Ubx, 2004)
 Urbanizer (Ubx, 2004)
 Urbanator III (2005)
 Michal Urbaniak's Group (2005)
 I Jazz Love You (Ubx, 2006)
 Sax Love (Ubx, 2006)
 Polish Wind (Minor Music, 2007)
 Miles of Blue (2009)

As sideman
With Urszula Dudziak
 1976 Urszula
 1977 Midnight Rain
 1979 Future Talk
 1983 Sorrow Is Not Forever...But Love Is

With others
 1971 Swiss Suite, Oliver Nelson
 1974 Journey, Arif Mardin (Atlantic)
 1977 Tomorrow's Promises, Don Pullen
 1977 The Lion and the Ram, Larry Coryell
 1980 Swish, Michael Brecker
 1981 Stratus, Charly Antolini/Billy Cobham
 1984 Islands, Scott Cossu
 1986 Tutu, Miles Davis
 1987 Music from Siesta, Miles Davis/Marcus Miller
 1987 The Camera Never Lies, Michael Franks
 1989 Whispers and Promises, Earl Klugh
 1994 Rejoicing, Paul Bley
 1994 Mo' Jamaica Funk, Tom Browne
 1995 Present Tense, Lenny White
 2002 Glass Menagerie, Billy Cobham
 2003 Nevertheless, Bob Malach
 2004 Music for Planets, People, and Washing Machines, Randy Bernsen

References

External links 

 
 Michał Urbaniak at Filmweb

1943 births
Living people
Male jazz composers
Polish jazz composers
Polish jazz musicians
Polish jazz violinists
21st-century violinists
21st-century male musicians